The University of Maryland Athletic Hall of Fame was established in 1982 by the M Club Foundation to honor student-athletes,  coaches, and administrators who made significant contributions to athletics at the University of Maryland. The Hall of Fame was established by athletic director Dick Dull, Jack Faber, Tom Fields, Al Heagy, Jim Kehoe, Art Kramer and Jack Scarbath, who determined the selection criteria and the organization's by-laws. The criteria and by-laws were later approved by an Election Committee of coaches and letter winners appointed by Dick Dull.

Criteria
The Election Committee consists of the current athletic director, coaches, alumni, and athletic department staff. The committee meets each year in May to consider nominations. Anyone is eligible to nominate candidates for induction.
Letter winners must be out of school for at least ten years
Athletic department staff must have earned a letter or served for at least 15 years
Record of "superior athletic accomplishments", which may include those achieved after leaving the university
Selection is based upon athletic merit alone
Candidate must be of "good character and reputation"
Candidates who have achieved induction into a national hall of fame merit automatic induction, provided they meet the other criteria

Inductees

References

External links
Official website
Hotsy Alperstein papers

Hall
Halls of fame in Maryland
Maryland
Awards established in 1982
1982 establishments in Maryland